Maria Ilona is a 1939 German historical drama film directed by Géza von Bolváry and starring Paula Wessely, Willy Birgel, and Paul Hörbiger. The film is set in Austria during the reign of Ferdinand I. It is an adaptation of Oswald Richter-Tersik's novel Ilona Beck.

Cast

References

Bibliography

External links 
 

1939 films
German historical drama films
1930s historical drama films
1930s German-language films
Films directed by Géza von Bolváry
Films set in Vienna
Films set in Hungary
Films set in the 1840s
Films set in the 1850s
Films of Nazi Germany
Terra Film films
German black-and-white films
1939 drama films
1930s German films